Screen Violence is the fourth studio album by Scottish synth-pop band Chvrches. It was released on 27 August 2021 through EMI Records in the UK and Glassnote Records in the US. Lead single "He Said She Said" was released on 19 April. The album was announced alongside the second single, "How Not to Drown", a collaboration with Robert Smith, lead singer of the Cure.

The album was promoted with a North American tour from November to December 2021.

Background and recording
The album began in 2020 during the COVID-19 pandemic as ideas shared over video calls and audio-sharing programs. It was produced by the band and recorded between Glasgow and Los Angeles. Frontwoman Lauren Mayberry said it felt "freeing initially" for the album to start out as something "escapist" but that the lyrics ended up being "definitely still personal". The album title came from an idea for the name of the band, but was then adapted for the title of the album due to the theme of violence "on screen, by screens and through screens – with songs addressing feelings of loneliness, disillusionment and fear, among other emotions". Martin Doherty called the album title "a bit more literal [than just a concept]. When we were making the record, it was like half of our lives were lived through screens."

The single "How Not to Drown" evolved from a piano and drum demo recorded by Doherty and was written during a time when he was dealing with "crippling depression and anxiety".

Screen Violence is also the first Chvrches studio album to not have a track where Martin Doherty provides the main vocals, though Doherty does sing the bridge on "Violent Delights".

Track listing

Personnel
Chvrches
 Lauren Mayberry – vocals, keyboards, percussion, production
 Iain Cook – keyboards, programming, guitar, bass, production, mixing
 Martin Doherty – keyboards, programming, guitar, bass, additional vocals on "Violent Delights", production, mixing

Additional personnel
 Robert Smith – vocals, bass (playing a Fender Bass VI) and backwards guitar on "How Not To Drown"
 Gavin Lurssen – mastering
 Samuel Stewart – vocal engineering
 Scott Kiernan – creative direction
 Lary 7 – original cover photography

Charts

References

2021 albums
Chvrches albums
Glassnote Records albums
EMI Records albums